Jean Michel N'Lend  (born May 8, 1986) is a Cameroonian footballer.

Club career

Al-Shorta
Jean Michel N'Lend was the third foreign player to join Al Shorta in its history following the signings of fellow Cameroonian Innocent Awoa and Ivorian defender Sékou Tidiane Souaré. He made an instant impression at Al Shorta, scoring in friendly matches against Al Naft and Naft Al Junoob. His first league goals came against Al Shorta's fierce rivals Al Quwa Al Jawiya at the Al Shaab Stadium, where N'Lend scored a hat-trick of headers to seal a 4–1 victory. This was when N'Lend became a fan favourite and wrote his name into the history books, becoming the first-ever non-Iraqi to score a hat-trick in the Iraqi Premier League. He then went on to score again at the Al Shaab Stadium against Al Naft in a 2–2 draw, followed by the winning goal against Naft Al Junoob in a 2–1 win. He continued his impressive record of scoring in every game he had played at Al Shaab Stadium with the winning goal in a 2–1 win over huge rivals Al Zawraa, however that record ended five days later in a 1–1 draw with Al Talaba, a game in which he missed an open goal. He eventually left the club in May 2013 after a dip in form; Al Shorta's vice-president Adnan Jafar stated that the club had several players that were capable of filling in his position.

References

External links

Iraqsport

1986 births
Living people
Cameroonian footballers
Cameroonian expatriate footballers
Association football forwards
Shanghai Shenhua F.C. players
Liaoning F.C. players
Chinese Super League players
Expatriate footballers in Algeria
Cameroonian expatriate sportspeople in Algeria
Expatriate footballers in Slovakia
Cameroonian expatriate sportspeople in Slovakia
Expatriate footballers in China
MC Oran players
Cameroonian expatriate sportspeople in China
Fovu Baham players
Expatriate footballers in Morocco
Cameroonian expatriate sportspeople in Morocco
Fath Union Sport players
FC DAC 1904 Dunajská Streda players
Slovak Super Liga players
Al-Shorta SC players
Expatriate footballers in Iraq
Cameroonian expatriate sportspeople in Iraq
Expatriate footballers in Jordan
Cameroonian expatriate sportspeople in Jordan